The 2004 Kärcher Canadian Junior Curling Championships were held February 7–15 at the Juan de Fuca Recreation Centre in Victoria, British Columbia. The winning teams represented Canada at the 2004 World Junior Curling Championships.

Men's

Teams

Standings

Results

Draw 1

Draw 2

Draw 3

Draw 4

Draw 5

Draw 6

Draw 7

Draw 8

Draw 9

Draw 10

Draw 11

Draw 12

Draw 13

Playoffs

Semifinal

Final

Women's

Teams

Standings

Results

Draw 1

Draw 2

Draw 3

Draw 4

Draw 5

Draw 6

Draw 7

Draw 8

Draw 9

Draw 10

Draw 11

Draw 12

Draw 13

Playoffs

Semifinal

Final

Qualification

Ontario
The Teranet Ontario Junior Curling Championships were held January 7–11 at the Oakville Curling Club in Oakville.

Kelly Cochrane defeated Lee Merklinger from the Granite Curling Club of West Ottawa in the women's final. Merklinger had beaten the Julie Reddick rink from Oakville 3-1 in the semifinal.

In the men's final, John Epping of Peterborough defeated Mark Bice of Sarnia 8-5. Epping had beaten the Ottawa Curling Club's Mike McLean rink 7-5 in the semifinal

External links
Women's statistics
Men's statistics
 (pages. 84, 178)

References

Canadian Junior Curling Championships
Curling in British Columbia
Sports competitions in Victoria, British Columbia
Canadian Junior Curling Championships
2004 in British Columbia
February 2004 sports events in Canada